Dave Rempis (born March 24, 1975) is an American free jazz saxophonist. He plays alto, tenor and baritone saxophone.

Life and career
Dave was born in Wellesley, Massachusetts in 1975. He began his musical studies at the age of 8. In 1993, Rempis began a degree in classical saxophone at Northwestern University with Frederick Hemke. As part of his studies in anthropology, he spent a year at the International Centre for African Music and Dance at the University of Ghana in Legon, studying African music and ethnomusicology. After graduating from Northwestern in 1997, Rempis decided to focus on performing, and in March 1998 was asked to replace saxophonist Mars Williams in the Chicago jazz band The Vandermark Five, led by saxophonist Ken Vandermark.

During his tenure with The Vandermark Five, Rempis also began to develop many Chicago-based groups and cooperative units as Triage, The Rempis Percussion Quartet, The Engines, Ballister and  The Rempis/Daisy Duo. He recorded for labels such as Okka Disk, 482 Music, Clean Feed, Not Two, and Aerophonic, an artist-run label that Rempis founded in the winter of 2013. His collaborations include a wide variety of creative improvised music legends, ranging from Peter Brötzmann and John Tchicai to Joe McPhee and Roscoe Mitchell.

Rempis also works as a presenter in the Chicago area. He has served as a curator for the Elastic Arts Foundation’s weekly "Improvised Music" concert series, helped establish the Umbrella Music collective and its annual music festival, worked as lead organizer of the Downtown Sound Gallery concert series at Gallery 37, and was also a key organizer of the yearly Pitchfork Music Festival.

Discography

As leader/co-leader

As sideman

References

External links
Official site
Interview : Dave Rempis at Burning Ambulance
Dave Rempis: Communication, Improvisation And No Screwing Around at All About Jazz
A Chat with Dave Rempis: Jazz, Aerophones & Telepathic Empathy at Gapers Block

1975 births
Living people
Free jazz saxophonists
People from Wellesley, Massachusetts
Musicians from Massachusetts
Northwestern University alumni
21st-century saxophonists
Okka Disk artists